Davide Maccagnan (born 23 December 1987) is an Italian male canoeist who won four medals at senior level at the Wildwater Canoeing World Championships and European Wildwater Championships.

Biography
At international competitions he competed in kayak and Canadian races.

Achievements

References

External links
 

1987 births
Living people
Italian male canoeists
21st-century Italian people